Xingcheng Haibin National Park is a coastal national park in Liaoning Province, China.  It is located south of the city center of Xingcheng, with an offshore island component, Juehua Island, once a sanctuary for the Prince of Yan on the run from the ruthless Qin Shihuang.    The park's name may also be translated as "Xingcheng Seaside Resort".  The main beach is reachable by bus; Juhua Island is 9 km offshore, and is accessible by ferry.  Although designated as a national park, Xingcheng Haibin is not listed as a "protected area" in the World Database of Protected Areas (WDPA).

External links
  Description of Xingchen and Juhua Island, in Lonely Planet - China

References

National parks of China
Tourist attractions in Liaoning
Geography of Liaoning